Kolky, also Kolki is an urban-type settlement in Lutsk Raion of Volyn Oblast in Ukraine, located in the historic region of Volhynia. Kolky has a population of 

Kolky is located on the confluence of the Styr and Rudka rivers, 51 kilometres north-east of Lutsk.

History 

First time mentioned in 1545. The place has the urban-type settlement status since 1940.

A local underground administration was organized in Kolky by Ukrainian partisans during the Second World War.

The Jewish population was important before World War II, around a third of the total population (724 members in 1921, 860 in 1937). The German army occupied the city at the end of 1941. 50 Jews were murdered by the Ukrainian police during the summer of 1941. In October 1941, Jews were forced to live in a ghetto. In July 1942, the Jewish population was massacred by an Einsatzgruppen of Germans, members of Sicherheitsdienst and Gendarmerie and by Ukrainians, members of the local police.

Also local Polish population fell victim to genocide. On June 13, 1943, dozens of Poles were burned alive in the local Catholic church by the Ukrainians as part of the genocide of Poles in Volhynia.

The heraldry and the gonfalon are adopted in 1997. The bell is a symbol of the defensive role of the city throughout history. The linaceae is a local resource.

Notable people 
 Tadeusz Piotrowski, Polish mountaineer, was born in Kolki
 Family of Esther Safran Foer, writer and mother of Jonathan Safran Foer

See also
Kolky Republic

References

External links 
  Official website
  Topographic map
  Road map
 

Urban-type settlements in Lutsk Raion
Holocaust locations in Ukraine